Love Will Grow – Rosebud Volume 1 is the debut extended play by Australian alternative rock group, The Stems. It was produced by Rob Younger, vocalist of Radio Birdman, and Alan Thorne (Hoodoo Gurus, The Screaming Tribesmen, Paul Kelly and the Coloured Girls). The EP was released in February 1986 through Citadel Records, the EP has never been released on a CD format. The EP reached No. 72 on the Australian Kent Music Report Singles Chart.

Track listing
 "Love Will Grow"  
 "Under Your Mushroom"  
 "Just Ain't Enough"  
 "Jumping to Conclusions"

Charts

References

General
 
  Note: Archived [on-line] version has limited functionality.
Specific

The Stems albums
1986 EPs